Hyperoodon (or Hyperoödon) is a genus of beaked whale, containing just two species: the Northern and Southern bottlenose whales. While not in the genus Hyperoodon, Longman's beaked whales are alternatively called tropical bottlenose whales due to their physical features resembling those of bottlenose whales.

They are considered to be molluscivorous, eating mainly squid.

References

Ziphiids